The government of Arizona is the governmental structure of the state of Arizona as established by the Arizona Constitution. The executive is composed of the Governor, several other statewide elected officials, and the Governor's cabinet. The Arizona Legislature consists of the House of Representatives and Senate. The judiciary is composed of the Arizona Supreme Court and lower courts. There is also local government, consisting of counties, municipalities and special districts.

Executive 
The statewide elected officers are:

All elected officials hold a term of four years, and are limited to two consecutive terms (except the office of the State Mine Inspector, which is limited to 4 terms). Arizona is one of seven states that do not have a specified lieutenant governor, so the Secretary of State is the first in line to succeed the Governor in the event of death, disability, resignation, or removal from office. The line of succession also includes the attorney general, state treasurer and superintendent of public instruction. Elections for statewide officers occur during even numbered, none presidential, years, except that 3 of the corporation commissioners are elected during presidential years.

Cabinet 
The state departments and agencies are:

 Arizona Department of Administration (ADOA)
 Arizona Department of Agriculture (AZDA)
 Arizona Department of Child Safety
 Arizona Department of Commerce
 Arizona Department of Corrections (ADC)
 Arizona Department of Economic Security (DES)
 Arizona Department of Education (ADE)
 Arizona Department of Emergency and Military Affairs (DEMA)
 Arizona Department of Environmental Quality (ADEQ)
 Arizona Department of Fire, Building and Life Safety (DFBLS)
 Arizona State Forestry Division (AZSF)
 Arizona Game and Fish Department (AZGFD)
 Arizona Department of Gaming (ADG)
 Arizona Geological Survey (AZGS)
 Arizona Department of Homeland Security (AZDOHS)
 Arizona Health Care Cost Containment System (AHCCCS)
 Arizona Department of Health Services (ADHS)
 Arizona Historical Society
 Arizona Department of Housing
 Arizona Department of Insurance and Financial Institutions (AZDIFI)
 Arizona Department of Juvenile Corrections (ADJC)
 Arizona State Land Department
 Arizona Department of Liquor Licenses and Control (DLLC)
 Arizona State Schools for the Deaf and Blind
 Arizona Department of Public Safety (DPS)
 Arizona Department of Real Estate (ADRE)
 Arizona Board of Regents
 Arizona Registrar of Contractors (ROC)
 Arizona Residential Utility Consumer Office (RUCO)
 Arizona Department of Revenue (ADOR)
 Arizona School Facilities Board (SFB)
 Arizona Office of Tourism (AOT)
 Arizona Department of Transportation (ADOT)
 Arizona Department of Veterans' Services (DVS)
 Arizona Department of Water Resources (ADWR)
 Arizona Department of Weights and Measures (AZDWM). Eliminated in 2015.

Arizona Boards and Commissions Include
 Arizona Commission for the Deaf and Hard of Hearing
 Arizona Commission of Indian Affairs
 Arizona Independent Redistricting Commission
 Arizona Judicial Conduct Commission
 Arizona Power Authority Commission
 Arizona State Boxing Commission
 Arizona State Lottery Commission
 Arizona State Board of Dispensing Opticians
 Arizona State Parks Board

Legislature 

The Arizona Legislature is bicameral and consists of the 60-member Arizona House of Representatives and the 30-member Arizona Senate. Each of the thirty legislative districts has one senator and two representatives. Legislators are elected for two-year terms and are limited to four consecutive terms in a chamber, though there is no limit on the total number of terms.

Each Legislature covers a two-year period. The first session following the general election is known as the first regular session, and the session convening in the second year is known as the second regular session. Each regular session begins on the second Monday in January and adjourns sine die (terminates for the year) no later than Saturday of the week in which the 100th day from the beginning of the regular session falls. The President of the Senate and Speaker of the House, by rule, may extend the session up to seven additional days. Thereafter, the session can only be extended by a majority vote of members present of each house.

Judiciary 

The Arizona Supreme Court is the highest court in Arizona. The court currently consists of one chief justice, a vice chief justice, and five (5) associate justices. Justices are appointed by the governor from a list recommended by a bipartisan commission, and are re-elected after the initial two years following their appointment. Subsequent re-elections occur every six years. The supreme court has appellate jurisdiction in death penalty cases, but almost all other appellate cases go through the Arizona Court of Appeals beforehand. The court has original jurisdiction in a few other circumstances, as outlined in the state constitution. The court may also declare laws unconstitutional, but only while seated en banc. The court meets in the Arizona Supreme Court Building at the capitol complex (at the southern end of Wesley Bolin Plaza).

The Arizona Court of Appeals, further divided into two divisions, is the intermediate court in the state. It hears and decides cases in three judge panels. Division One is based in Phoenix, consists of sixteen judges, and has jurisdiction in the Western and Northern regions of the state, along with the greater Phoenix area. Division Two is based in Tucson, consists of six judges, and has jurisdiction over the Southern regions of the state, including the Tucson area. Judges are selected in a method similar to the one used for state supreme court justices.

The Arizona Superior Court is the court of general jurisdiction. The Superior Court also acts as an appellate court for justice and municipal courts.

The Arizona justice courts are nonrecord courts of limited jurisdiction in each county, presided over by a justice of the peace who is elected for a four-year term, that have jurisdiction over civil lawsuits where the amount in dispute is $10,000 or less, landlord and tenant controversies, small claims cases and the full range of civil and criminal traffic offenses, including DUIs, and other types of misdemeanor allegations (e.g. shoplifting, writing bad checks, violating restraining orders).

The Arizona municipal courts, also known as city courts or magistrate courts, are nonrecord courts of limited jurisdiction that have criminal jurisdiction over misdemeanor crimes and petty offenses committed in their city or town and share jurisdiction with justice courts over violations of state law committed within their city or town limits, and hear misdemeanor criminal traffic cases such as driving under the influence of alcohol, hit-and-run and reckless driving where no serious injuries occur, and hear civil traffic cases, violations of city ordinances and codes, and issue orders of protection and injunctions prohibiting harassment, and can also issue search warrants.

Local government 

Arizona is divided into political jurisdictions designated as counties, which derive all of their power from the state. Incorporated cities and towns are those that have been granted home rule, possessing a local government in the form of a city or town council.

See also 
 Politics of Arizona
 Political party strength in Arizona
 Arizona Independent Redistricting Commission

References

External links 
 AZ.Gov

 
Arizona